Greater Toronto Services Board (GTSB) was created in 1998 under the Greater Toronto Services Act by the province of Ontario and began sessions in 1999. It was created following the amalgamation of the City of Toronto. In some ways it was seen as a replacement for Metro Toronto Council and regional councils around Toronto. With the lack of real political power, the GTSB ceased to exist in 2001.

The board met at the Black Creek Pioneer Village administration building at 1000 Murray Ross Parkway in North York.

Board

The GTSB comprised local politicians appointed by their respective councils:

 Mayor of Toronto
 10 Toronto City Councillors
 city councillor of the City of Mississauga (and also a member of Peel Region Council)
 Mayor of Hamilton, Ontario

York Region was later added as a member of the GTSB.

Members of GTSB included:

 Alan Tonks 1999-2000 - Chair
 Gordon Chong 2001 - Chair
 Mel Lastman - member from Toronto 1999-2001
 Case Ootes - alternate for Mayor Lastman
 Toronto City Councillors (and alternates)
 Joanne Flint
 Bill Saundercook
 Dennis Fotinos
 Betty Disero
 Mario Giansante
 Mike Tzekas
 Tom Jakobek
 Jack Layton
 Norm Kelly
 Doug Holyday
 Joan King
 Ron Moeser
Chris Korwin-Kuczynski
 Mario Silva
 Howard Moscoe
 Maria Augimeri
 Joe Pantalone
 Sherene Shaw
 David Shiner
 Bas Balkissoon
 Hazel McCallion - member from Peel Region 1999-2001
 William F. Bell - member from York Region and former Mayor of Richmond Hill, Ontario
 Bob Morrow - member from Hamilton, Mayor of Hamilton 1999-2000
 Robert E. Wade - member from Hamilton, Mayor of Hamilton 2000-2001

Powers

The GTSB had power to deal with school taxes, but the only real power was the operation and financial responsibility for GO Transit from 1998 to 2001.

References
 Greater Toronto Services Act 1998
 Developing Framework for a Greater Toronto Service Board
 GTSB Submission to the  Canada Transportation Act Review
 Provincial act creating GTSB, 1998

History of Toronto